Ludvig Rinde (born 24 March 1991) is a retired Norwegian football defender. He played for Tromsø before he joined Tromsdalen ahead of the 2012 season.

Club career

Rinde was born in Tromsø. He made his debut for Tromsø 10 April 2011 against Start, they won the game 2–0. Debut for Tromsdalen came on 9 April 2012 against Ranheim, the lost the game 1–3.

Career statistics

References

1991 births
Living people
Sportspeople from Tromsø
Norwegian footballers
Association football forwards
Tromsdalen UIL players
Tromsø IL players
Norwegian First Division players
Eliteserien players